BeritaSatu (News One) is a television news program that broadcasts on the Indonesian TV station  BTV. Its slogan is "Bersatu Menginspirasi." (United to Inspire).

BeritaSatu changed its name to BTV on  October 11, 2022, following its purchase by Enggartiasto Lukita.

References

External links 

  Official Site
  BTV site

Indonesian television news shows
2022 Indonesian television series debuts
2020s Indonesian television series
BTV (Indonesia) original programming